Fabrice Ndala Muamba (born 6 April 1988) is an English former professional footballer who played for Arsenal, Birmingham City and Bolton Wanderers as a central midfielder. Born in Zaire, Muamba moved to England at the age of 11 and subsequently played for England up to under-21 level.

Muamba began his career in 2002, joining Arsenal's youth academy. After three years, he turned professional in 2005. He made his debut for Arsenal in the League Cup, but played only one other professional match for the club. Following a loan spell with Birmingham City, he made the move permanent in 2007. He stayed with Birmingham City for one additional year, and left after making more than 70 appearances and making his England under-21 debut while with the team. He joined Bolton Wanderers in 2008.

In March 2012, Muamba suffered a cardiac arrest during a televised FA Cup match between Bolton and Tottenham Hotspur, from which he recovered despite his heart having stopped for 78 minutes. Following medical advice, he announced his retirement from professional football in August 2012. He later completed a degree in sports journalism before making a return to football as a youth coach.

Early life
Muamba was born in Kinshasa, Zaire (now the Democratic Republic of the Congo). His father fled the country in 1994 because of his political views and arrived in the United Kingdom seeking asylum. In 1999, he was granted indefinite leave to remain, at which time he was joined by the rest of the family. They settled in east London, where Muamba attended Kelmscott School in Walthamstow. Despite having arrived in Britain aged 11, unable to speak English, he went on to achieve 10 GCSEs and A-levels in English, French and mathematics.

Club career

Arsenal
Muamba was associated with Arsenal's youth system as a schoolboy from 2002, joining their Academy as a first-year scholar in August 2004. He signed his first professional contract in October 2005 and made his first team debut on 25 October in a League Cup tie against Sunderland, in front of a 47,000 crowd at the Stadium of Light. He made his second and final first team appearance for Arsenal in the next round, against Reading, where he contributed to a 3–0 victory.

Birmingham City
In August 2006, Muamba joined Championship club Birmingham City on a season-long loan. After a slow start, his energetic style of play, which has been likened to that of his hero Patrick Vieira, established him as a regular starter in central midfield. The fans were equally impressed, voting him their Young Player of the Season.

On 11 May 2007 Muamba made his move to Birmingham City permanent, signing a three-year contract for a fee reported by the club of £4 million. He scored his first goal for the club, a close-range volley from a corner, on 12 March 2008 in a 4–2 defeat at Portsmouth. He made 37 appearances as Birmingham were relegated from the Premier League after one season back in the top tier.

Bolton Wanderers

On 16 June 2008, Muamba joined Premier League Bolton Wanderers for a fee of £5 million, with add-ons worth a further £750,000, on a four-year contract. He scored his first goal for the club against Wigan Athletic on 13 March 2010. In recognition of his impressive 2009–10 season at Bolton, he was named as The Bolton News Player of the Season. On 7 August, Muamba signed a new four-year contract with Bolton.

Muamba scored on the opening day of the 2011–12 league season, in Bolton's 4–0 away win against Queens Park Rangers. He then scored his first ever goal in the League Cup, against his old club Arsenal in a 2–1 defeat.

Cardiac arrest and retirement

On 17 March 2012, Muamba suffered a cardiac arrest and collapsed during the first half of an FA Cup quarter-final match between Bolton and Tottenham Hotspur at White Hart Lane. After receiving lengthy attention on the pitch from medical personnel – including a consultant cardiologist who was at the game as a fan – Muamba was taken to the specialist coronary care unit at the London Chest Hospital. Bolton manager Owen Coyle and club captain Kevin Davies accompanied Muamba in the ambulance. The match was abandoned by referee Howard Webb, and Bolton's next game, against Aston Villa, due to be played three days later, was postponed at the club's request. Aston Villa raised no objection.

Bolton's club doctor later confirmed that Muamba had received numerous defibrillator shocks both on the pitch and in the ambulance, but his heart had stopped for 78 minutes. The player was initially kept under anaesthesia in intensive care. By 19 March, his heart was beating without medication and he was able to move his limbs. Later that day his condition was described as "serious" rather than "critical" and he was able to recognise family members and respond appropriately to questions. By 21 March, his consultant suggested that Muamba's progress had "exceeded our expectations" and that although he faced a "lengthy recovery period", "normal life is within the spectrum of possibility".

Two weeks after the incident, a photograph was released of Muamba sitting up in his hospital bed and smiling. He was discharged from hospital on 16 April, having been fitted with an implantable cardioverter-defibrillator (ICD). Muamba attended Bolton's home match against Tottenham Hotspur on 2 May, where he expressed his gratitude for the support he had received.

On 15 August 2012, Bolton announced that Muamba had retired from professional football, based on the recommendation of his medical team. Muamba said:

On 8 November 2012, Muamba returned to White Hart Lane for the first time since his cardiac arrest and received a standing ovation from the crowd. Muamba later played 15 minutes in Ian Goodison's testimonial match in 2015.

Post-playing career

Media work
Following his retirement from the game, Muamba was part of ITV's coverage of the 2013 Africa Cup of Nations. He was also a co-commentator alongside Derek Rae on BT Sport's coverage of the African World Cup qualification third round play-offs.

Journalism
Muamba studied for a BA in sports journalism at Staffordshire University; as part of his course he went on work placement at BBC North West Tonight. In July 2015, he graduated with honours.

Coaching
In March 2015, Muamba took some coaching sessions at Liverpool's academy. He later did his UEFA B Licence at Manchester City and A Licence at Stoke City.

In September 2018, he coached Rochdale's under-16 side while studying for his coaching badges, and in 2022, he returned to Bolton Wanderers to work in their academy where he was appointed as under-15s coach.

International career
As a naturalised British citizen, Muamba was eligible to play for any of the Home Nations in which he had received three years of full-time education before the age of 18 or lived in for five years. In Muamba's case, that was just England, whom he represented at all youth levels, and captained the U-19 team. He received his first call-up for England U21 for the friendly against Romania U-21 on 21 August 2007 at Ashton Gate, Bristol, and made his debut as a second-half substitute.

Muamba had also been called up to the DR Congo squad in May 2007, but declined so as to remain eligible for England.

Personal life
Muamba met Shauna Magunda while he was a Birmingham City player and she was studying for a master's degree at Birmingham City University. They became engaged on 14 February 2012, married at Peckforton Castle, Cheshire, on 21 October 2012, and, have four children. Muamba has been described as "deeply religious", and stated he would have sought a career in accountancy had he not become a professional footballer.

In July 2012, the University of Bolton awarded an honorary doctorate to Muamba, which he accepted on behalf of those involved in saving his life. He took part in the 2012 Christmas Special edition of the BBC programme Strictly Come Dancing.

Career statistics

Honours
England U21
UEFA European Under-21 Championship runners-up: 2009

References

External links

1988 births
Living people
Footballers from Kinshasa
Footballers from Walthamstow
Democratic Republic of the Congo footballers
English footballers
England youth international footballers
England under-21 international footballers
Association football midfielders
Arsenal F.C. players
Birmingham City F.C. players
Bolton Wanderers F.C. players
English Football League players
Premier League players
Naturalised citizens of the United Kingdom
Democratic Republic of the Congo emigrants to England
British Christians
People associated with the University of Bolton
Black British sportsmen
Alumni of Staffordshire University
Refugees in the United Kingdom
Bolton Wanderers F.C. non-playing staff